Mont Choungui is a distinctively conical volcanic mountain in the southern part of the French island of Mayotte, in the Comoro archipelago of the western Indian Ocean.

Important Bird Area
Choungui dominates the southern peninsula of the island. Its south-easternmost headland, Pointe Saziley, is 4 km long with a sharp ridge rising to 233 m. Forest covers the peak and most of the catchment of the Mroni Bé river, while Sazilé is vegetated with dry shrubland and thickets containing baobabs. The 1600 ha site has been identified as an Important Bird Area (IBA) by BirdLife International because it supports significant populations of Comoro olive-pigeons, Comoro blue-pigeons, Mayotte white-eyes, Mayotte sunbirds and red-headed fodies. It is also home to Robert Mertens's day geckos, island day geckos and Pasteur's day geckos. Sazilé's beaches are a nesting site for green, and probably hawksbill, sea turtles.

References

External links
Video

Choungui
Important Bird Areas of Mayotte